MTV Party To Go Volume 5 was the fifth album in the MTV Party To Go series.  The album was certified Gold on September 20, 1994 by the RIAA.

Track listing
 "Anniversary (Quiet Storm)" – Tony! Toni! Toné!
 "Let Me Ride" (Extra Clean Radio Edit) – Dr. Dre
 "Boom! Shake the Room" (Ultimix) – DJ Jazzy Jeff & The Fresh Prince
 "Slam" (Ultimix) – Onyx
 "Informer" (Ultimix) – Snow
 "I Get Around" (Remix) – 2Pac
 "Come Baby Come" (Ultimix) – K7
 "Whoomp! (There It Is)" (WPGC Remix) – Tag Team
 "Hey Mr. D.J." (Maurice's Club Mix W/Rap) – Zhané
 "What Is Love" (12" Mix) – Haddaway
 "Weak" (Bam Jam Jeep Mix) – SWV
 "Knockin' Da Boots" (LP Version) – H-Town

References

MTV series albums
1994 compilation albums
Tommy Boy Records compilation albums
Dance-pop compilation albums